The following list includes notable people who were born or have lived in Bennington, Vermont.

Artists and entertainers 

 Pamela Blair, actress, singer and dancer (Val in the musical A Chorus Line); born in Bennington
 Henry Brant, composer, awarded the Pulitzer Prize for Music (2002); taught at Bennington College
 Carleton Carpenter, actor (Summer Stock); born in Bennington
 Helen Frankenthaler, painter; attended Bennington College
 Robert Frost, poet, four time Pulitzer Prize winner; lived and buried in Bennington 
 Cynthia Gibb, actress and former model (Suzi on Search for Tomorrow); born in Bennington
 Milford Graves, free jazz drummer, percussion musician; instructor at Bennington College
 Miles Hyman, author and illustrator
 Stanley Edgar Hyman, literary critic; instructor at Bennington College
 Shirley Jackson, novelist and short story writer, author of ‘’The Lottery’’. Wife of Stanley Edgar Hyman; lived in Bennington
 Jamaica Kincaid, novelist (Lucy); lived in Bennington
 Ray Magliozzi, co-host of NPR's weekly radio show, Car Talk; taught science in Bennington
 Bernard Malamud, novelist and short story writer; taught at Bennington College 
 Jules Olitski, painter; taught at Bennington College (1963–1967)
 Mary Oliver, poet; lived in Bennington
 Beverley Owen, actress; lived and died in Bennington
 Allen Shawn, composer; instructor at Bennington College
 David Smith, sculptor
 R. John Wright, doll designer and maker; lives in Bennington

Professionals 

 Ethan Allen, soldier, author, philosopher, land speculator and businessman 
 Hiram Bingham, missionary
 William L. Burke, professor
 Edward Hamlin Everett, founder of the Bennington Museum
 Lydia Mary Fay (1804–1878), missionary, educator, writer, and translator
 Nathaniel Fillmore, farmer and father of President Millard Fillmore
 James Fisk Jr., financier
 Simon Fraser, fur trader and explorer
 Daniel Williams Harmon, fur trader and diarist
 Anthony Haswell, printer, journalist and free speech champion
 Herbert William Heinrich, industrial safety pioneer
 Horace Chapin Henry, businessman and art gallery founder
 Alfred Lebbeus Loomis, physician
 Alexander Nemerov, art historian
 Trenor W. Park, lawyer, businessman, politician and philanthropist
 Isaac G. Perry, architect
 Henry W. Putnam, inventor, manufacturer, businessman and philanthropist
 John Spargo, author, historian and socialist intellectual
 John F. Winslow, industrialist and college president

Military 

 Reginald W. Buzzell, U.S. Army brigadier general, resided in Bennington
 David Fay, participant in the Battle of Bennington during the American Revolution, Adjutant General of the Vermont Militia during the War of 1812, Judge of the Vermont Supreme Court
 David Robinson, major general in the state militia and U.S. Marshal for Vermont
 Seth Warner, officer in the Green Mountain Boys

Murderers 

 Mary Rogers, murderer
 Elizabeth Van Valkenburgh, murderer

Law

 Orion M. Barber, U.S. federal judge
 Samuel H. Blackmer, Associate Justice of the Vermont Supreme Court
 Charles Dewey Day, superior court judge in Canada
 John Fassett Jr., Justice of the Vermont Supreme Court
 David Fay, Justice of the Vermont Supreme Court
 Jonas Fay, Justice of the Vermont Supreme Court
 James Stuart Holden, federal judge
 Pierpoint Isham, Justice of the Vermont Supreme Court
 John Robinson, US Marshal for Vermont

Politics 

 Howard E. Armstrong, Secretary of State of Vermont
 Peter J. Brady, member of the Vermont House of Representatives
 Elijah Brush, second mayor of Detroit, Michigan
 T. Garry Buckley, lieutenant governor of Vermont
 Brian Campion, member of the Vermont Senate
 Nathan Clark, speaker of the Vermont House of Representatives
 Timothy R. Corcoran, member of the Vermont House of Representatives and Bennington town clerk
 Timothy Corcoran II, member of the Vermont House of Representatives
 Charles Hial Darling, Assistant Secretary of the Navy
 Joseph Fay, Secretary of State of Vermont
 Abraham B. Gardner, lieutenant governor of Vermont
 Hiland Hall, U.S. congressman, Governor of Vermont
 Emory S. Harris, US Marshal for Vermont
 Robert E. Healy, member of the U.S. Securities and Exchange Commission, Associate Justice of the Vermont Supreme Court
 Albert Krawczyk, member of the Vermont House of Representatives
 Frederick S. Lovell, Wisconsin state legislator, and Union Army officer in the American Civil War
 John G. McCullough, governor of Vermont
 Orsamus Cook Merrill, U.S. congressman
 Joseph Naper, member of the Illinois House of Representatives and founder of Naperville, Illinois
 Jesse O. Norton, U.S. congressman
 Paul Offner, educator and Wisconsin state legislator
 Jonathan Robinson, US senator
 Moses Robinson, U.S. senator and Governor of Vermont prior to statehood
 Richard W. Sears, member of the Vermont Senate
 Mark Shepard, member of the Vermont Senate
 Benjamin Swift, U.S. senator
 Isaac Tichenor, jurist, U.S. senator and the 5th Governor of Vermont
 David S. Walbridge, U.S. congressman
 Stephen K. Williams, member of the New York State Senate
 William Henry Wills, governor of Vermont
 Ralph G. Wright, Speaker of the Vermont House of Representatives

Sports 

 Peter Graves, Olympic announcer and cross-country ski coach for Harvard University
 Andrew Newell, Olympic cross country skier
 Betsy Shaw, Olympic snowboarder

References

Bennington, Vermont
Bennington